Lorne Resnick  (born May 16, 1961) is a Los Angeles-based photographer who was born and raised in Toronto, Canada.

An overland journey to Africa inspired Resnick to pursue photography in many countries, eventually leading him to Papua New Guinea, Vietnam, Greenland, Cuba, China, across Europe and to 22 countries in Africa.

References

External links 
 

1961 births
Living people
American photographers